The Boonslick, or Boone's Lick Country, is a cultural region of Missouri along the Missouri River that played an important role in the westward expansion of the United States and the development of Missouri's statehood in the early 19th century. The Boone's Lick Road, a route paralleling the north bank of the river between St. Charles and Franklin, Missouri, was the primary thoroughfare for settlers moving westward from St. Louis in the early 19th century. Its terminus in Franklin marked the beginning of the Santa Fe Trail, which eventually became a major conduit for Spanish trade in the Southwestern United States. Later it connected to the large emigrant trails, including the Oregon and California Trails, used by pioneers, gold-seekers and other early settlers of the West. The region takes its name from a salt spring or "lick" in western Howard County, used by Nathan and Daniel Morgan Boone, sons of famed frontiersman Daniel Boone.

Many of Missouri's early leaders came from the Boonslick. Its early French and Spanish colonial vestiges were overtaken by settlement of European-American migrants from the Upland South — largely Kentucky, Virginia, and Tennessee — who brought numerous African-American slaves with them. The region's borders often vary in definition but have included the present-day counties of Boone, Callaway, Cooper, Howard, and Saline. Before and after the American Civil War, the area developed as the center of a larger region known as Little Dixie.

Franklin, Missouri, founded in 1816, became a large port on the Missouri River and an early center of settlement and economic activity. There, the Boone's Lick Trail ended and William Becknell blazed the Santa Fe Trail to the west. The Chouteau brothers of St. Louis had previously established a fur trade monopoly with the Spanish in Santa Fe, and the fur trade was the basis of early St. Louis wealth.

Columbia, Missouri is the largest city in the region; it is the location of the flagship campus of the University of Missouri system, which was established in 1839. George Caleb Bingham painted in both Franklin and Columbia. His works illustrate pioneer and river life in the early and mid-nineteenth century. Other early towns were Arrow Rock, Boonville, Fayette, and Rocheport. In 1827, Franklin was lost to the powerful floods of the river, and the town was re-built upon the bluff as New Franklin. The Smithton Company established the village of Smithton, Missouri, which would later grow into the city of Columbia.

In the 21st century, the area is predominantly rural, with the exception of the city of Columbia. The region is adjacent to the Missouri Rhineland and maintains its own developed vineyards. The Katy Trail State Park runs along the Missouri River, providing recreational access by a conversion of former railroad lines to trails for biking and walking.

See also
National Register of Historic Places listings in Howard County, Missouri
National Register of Historic Places listings in Boone County, Missouri
List of cemeteries in Boone County, Missouri
Great Osage Trail

References

External links
Boonslick Historical Society
Boone's Lick Road Association

Regions of Missouri
Regions of the Southern United States
Pre-statehood history of Missouri
Missouri Territory in the War of 1812
African-American history in Columbia, Missouri
History of Columbia, Missouri